Tariq Al Harqan (Arabic:طارق الحرقان) is a Saudi football goalkeeper who played for Saudi Arabia in the 2004 Asian Cup. He also played for Al Shabab.

References

External links

11v11 Profile

1984 births
Living people
2004 AFC Asian Cup players
Al-Shabab FC (Riyadh) players
Saudi Arabian footballers
Place of birth missing (living people)
Saudi Professional League players
Association football goalkeepers
Saudi Arabia international footballers